Non Sombun is a tambon (subdistrict) of Ban Haet District, Khon Kaen Province, northeast Thailand (Isan). It is a hometown of Somluck Kamsing, a first Thai Olympic gold medalist.

History
Originally, Non Sombun was a muban (village) of Ban Pao, Ban Phai District, south of Mueang Khon Kaen District, Khon Kaen capital district. Later in 1985, Non Sombun Subdistrict was officially established with the Non Sombun Subdistrict Council as an administrator.

In 1995, the king amphoe (กิ่งอำเภอ, "minor district") Ban Haet was established. So Non Sombun moved up directly to the newly established minor district. Later, on January 19, 1996, the Ministry of Interior established Subdistrict Administrative Organization Non Sombun (SAO Non Sombun) in the administrative network of Ban Haet District until the present.

Geography
Its geography is a lowland alternating with some parts of the upland and some are the Chi river basins.

Neighbouring subdistricts are (from the north clockwise): Tha Phra in Mueang Khon Kaen District, Khwao Rai in Kosum Phisai District of Maha Sarakham Province, Ban Haet in its district, and Ban Ton in Phra Yuen District.

Administration
The entire area is under the administration of Subdistrict Administrative Organization Non Sombun.

The area also consists of 12 administrative villages.

The seal of the subdistrict features elephant raising its trunk.

Notes

External links
 
Tambon of Khon Kaen Province